The titles of count, then of duke of Savoy are titles of nobility attached to the historical territory of Savoy. Since its creation, in the 11th century, the county was held by the House of Savoy. The County of Savoy was elevated to a duchy at the beginning of the 15th century, bringing together all the territories of the Savoyard state and having Amadeus VIII as its first duke. In the 18th century, the duke Victor Amadeus II annexed the Kingdom of Sardinia to the historical possessions of the Duchy, and from then on, the Savoyard dukes also held the title of Kings of Sardinia.

Counts of Savoy

Dukes of Savoy

Kings of Sardinia

Dukes of Savoy post 1946 (Head of the house of Savoy)

See also
House of Savoy
List of consorts of Savoy
County of Savoy
Duchy of Savoy
Kingdom of Sardinia
List of monarchs of Sardinia
List of Sardinian consorts
Kingdom of Italy
King of Italy
List of Italian queens

References
Savoy Genealogy

Savoy
Savoy
 
 
 List
France history-related lists
Dukedoms of Italy

de:Savoyen#Liste der Herrscher von Savoyen
es:Casa de Saboya#Lista de monarcas de la Casa de Saboya